Tomasz Zdebel (born 25 May 1973) is a Polish-German former professional footballer who played as a defensive midfielder. He was active in his active career in Germany, Belgium and Turkey. From 2000 to 2003, he played for the Poland national team.

Early life
Zdebel was born and raised in Katowice, Poland. His father was a football player who worked as a miner during the week. In 1988 the family emigrated to Düsseldorf.

Club career
Zdebel started playing football with the local club GKS Katowice. Having emigrated to Germany, he joined the youth team of Fortuna Düsseldorf. He started his senior career in 1990 at Rot-Weiss Essen. One year later the team was relegated from the Bundesliga. In 1992 Zdebel joined 1. FC Köln and played for their reserve team. In 1993, he debuted for the first team.

He left Cologne in 1997 and moved to Lierse. In his first season the club finished seventh and qualified for the 1997–98 UEFA Champions League. The next season Lierse won the Belgian Cup. Zdebel played as central midfielder and as a defender for Lierse.

In 2000, Zdebel moved to Turkey and signed with Gençlerbirliği S.K. In 2003, he returned to Germany and joined VfL Bochum.

Coaching career
Zdebel runs a football school called Spofa-Fußballschule, alongside former footballer Andrzej Rudy.

In 2012, Zdebel began working as a youth coordinator for SV Bergisch Gladbach 09. After first team manager Dietmar Schacht was fired on 18 March 2015, Zdebel took over his position. On 2 October 2017, Zdebel resigned from his position.

On 4 November 2018, Zdebel was appointed as the manager of TV Herkenrath 09. After only eight weeks, on 4 January 2019, Zdebel resigned after a massive chaos, with several players leaving the club.

Career statistics

Honours
Lierse
 Belgian Cup: 1998–99
 Belgian Super Cup: 1997, 1999

Gençlerbirliği
 Turkish Cup: 2000–01

References

External links
 
 
 

1973 births
Living people
Sportspeople from Katowice
Footballers from Düsseldorf
German people of Polish descent
Association football midfielders
Polish footballers
Rot-Weiss Essen players
1. FC Köln players
1. FC Köln II players
VfL Bochum players
Gençlerbirliği S.K. footballers
Bayer 04 Leverkusen players
Bayer 04 Leverkusen II players
Alemannia Aachen players
Lierse S.K. players
Poland international footballers
Bundesliga players
2. Bundesliga players
Süper Lig players
Belgian Pro League players
Polish expatriate footballers
Polish expatriate sportspeople in Germany
Expatriate footballers in Germany
Polish expatriate sportspeople in Turkey
Expatriate footballers in Turkey
Polish expatriate sportspeople in Belgium
Expatriate footballers in Belgium
Naturalized citizens of Germany